vom Rath (not von Rath) is a German surname. It may refer to:

Adolph vom Rath (1832–1907), Prussian banker, co-founder of Deutsche Bank
Ernst vom Rath, a German diplomat assassinated 1938 in Paris
Gerhard vom Rath (1830–1888), German mineralogist
Carl vom Rath (died 13 September 1904), Prussian manufacturer in branch of sugar production (see image)
 Hanna Bekker, née vom Rath, also Hanna Bekker vom Rath (1893–1983), German painter

See also
 Rath (disambiguation)